Iñaki Abad (born 1963, Bilbao) is a Spanish writer. He studied Spanish philology at university and worked as a journalist and radio announcer before moving to Sicily to teach at the University of Catania. In 1991, he joined the Instituto Cervantes; he has since directed the centres to Naples, Milán, and Prague. In 2002, having spent a decade in Italy, he wrote his first novel based on his memories of Bilbao. El hábito de la guerra was a spy novel, as was his second novel, Los malos adioses en Nápoles.

References

Spanish novelists
1963 births
Living people